Oliver Zaugg (born 9 May 1981) is a Swiss former professional road bicycle racer, who competed professionally between 2004 and 2016 for , , , ,  and .

Career
Zaugg won his first major race in 2011, the Giro di Lombardia. He was chased relentlessly by the leading group, but the chasers could not get to him. In 2012, he tried to defend his title at the Giro di Lombardia, finishing in the chase group in eighth position as Joaquim Rodríguez claimed the victory.

After three seasons in October 2015, Zaugg agreed to join  for 2016. He ended his career at the 2016 Il Lombardia, a race he had previously won in 2011.

Major results

1999
 2nd Time trial, National Junior Road Championships
2003
 6th Rund um den Henninger Turm U23
 9th Gran Premio Palio del Recioto
2006
 7th Overall Vuelta a Andalucía
 8th Giro dell'Emilia
2008
 5th GP Triberg-Schwarzwald
 7th Memorial Cimurri
 8th Grand Prix of Aargau Canton
2010
 1st Stage 1b (TTT) Settimana Internazionale di Coppi e Bartali
 4th Overall Vuelta a Burgos
2011
 1st Giro di Lombardia
 1st Stage 1 (TTT) Vuelta a España
 8th Gran Premio Bruno Beghelli
 9th Giro dell'Emilia
2012
 8th Giro di Lombardia
2014
 7th Overall Tour of Austria

Grand Tour general classification results timeline

Monuments results timeline

References

External links

Swiss male cyclists
1981 births
Living people
Sportspeople from the canton of Schwyz